Strangely Beautiful is the fifth studio album by Swedish band Club 8.

Track listing
"When Lights Go Out"
"What Shall We Do Next?"
"I Wasn't Much of a Fight"
"Stay by My Side"
"Cold Hearts"
"Between Waking and Sleeping [Instrumental]"
"This Is the Morning"
"Next Step You'll Take"
"Beauty of the Way We're Living"
"Saturday Night Engine"
"We Move in Silence"

Reception
The album has been described as "arty experimentation....breezy, Cardigans-styled dream-pop with a decidedly retro-continental flair".

References

2003 albums
Club 8 albums